Leandro Desábato (born 24 January 1979), nicknamed Chavo, is an Argentine football manager and former player. His most recent role as manager was for Estudiantes LP.

Club career
Desábato began his professional career in 1997 playing for Estudiantes de La Plata. In 2001, he joined Olimpo and after one season with the club he moved on to play for Quilmes. With both teams he won promotion from the Primera B Nacional (Argentine second division) to the Primera División (first).

In a 2005 Copa Libertadores match, Desábato allegedly racially insulted São Paulo's player Grafite. Desábato was arrested after the match. Following his night in jail, Desábato was defended by columnist and former Brazilian international footballer Tostão who stated that the insults were not racist, simply the kind of provocation that has always existed in football.

Desábato left Quilmes in 2006 to join Argentinos Juniors and after a successful season with the club he returned to Estudiantes de La Plata. During the second half of 2008, he was a regular first team player for Estudiantes in their Copa Sudamericana campaign, where they reached the final.

Desábato was a key figure in Estudiantes' 2009 Copa Libertadores championship. He was the only outfield player on the team to play in every minute of every game during the team's run through the tournament, even as his center-back partners changed around him (from Agustín Alayes to Cristian Cellay to Rolando Schiavi).

In 2009 Desábato was chosen in a traditional journalist poll conducted by El País in the South American Team of the Year.

Personal life
Desábato's cousins, Andrés and Leandro Luis, are fellow footballers.

Honours
Olimpo
Primera B Nacional: 2001–02

Estudiantes
Copa Libertadores: 2009
Argentine Primera División: 2010 Apertura

References

External links
 Argentine Primera statistics at Fútbol XXI  
 

1979 births
Living people
Argentine footballers
Association football defenders
Estudiantes de La Plata footballers
Quilmes Atlético Club footballers
Olimpo footballers
Argentinos Juniors footballers
Argentine Primera División players
Primera Nacional players
J1 League players
Cerezo Osaka players
Copa Libertadores-winning players
Argentina international footballers
People from General López Department
Sportspeople from Santa Fe Province
Argentine football managers
Estudiantes de La Plata managers